Tropidocoleus bicarinatus is a species of beetle in the family Cerambycidae, the only species in the genus Tropidocoleus.

References

Acanthocinini